Knappskog is a village in Øygarden municipality in Vestland county, Norway. The village lies along the northeastern coast of the island of Sotra, about halfway between the villages of Ågotnes (to the north) and Kolltveit (to the south).

References

Villages in Vestland
Øygarden